IAME may refer to:

 Industrias Aeronáuticas y Mecánicas del Estado, an Argentinian state-run automotive and aeronautical manufacturing company
 International Academy of Management and Economics, a private business school in the Philippines
 Italian American Motor Engineering, a manufacturer of small engines for karts